Aristolochia scytophylla is a species of flowering plant in the family Aristolochiaceae. It is endemic to China.

References

 

scytophylla
Endemic flora of China
Endangered flora of Asia
Taxonomy articles created by Polbot